is a Japanese politician from Tokorozawa, Saitama. Having graduated from Chuo University, Saitō was elected to the city assembly of Tokorozawa in 1971. In 1979, he won the election for the prefectural assembly of Saitama and served for 12 years.

In October 1991, Saitō was elected mayor of Tokorozawa. While he was in office, in 1997, TV Asahi aired a news report alleging that the vegetables grown in Tokorozawa were polluted with dioxin. Saitō had his salary docked for covering up information about the pollution.

He announced in August 2007 that he would not run for a fifth term and was succeeded by Yoshiko Tōma in October 2007.

References
 
 

 Mayors of places in Saitama Prefecture
 Members of the Saitama Prefectural Assembly
1939 births
 Living people
 Honorary Companions of the Order of Australia
 People from Tokorozawa, Saitama
20th-century Japanese politicians
21st-century Japanese politicians